Iba-Balita Ngayon was the first noontime newscast of Studio 23 in the Philippines pitting up against GMA News TV's Balitanghali. This news program was aired from March 7, 2011, to August 3, 2012. It was produced by ABS-CBN Corporation through ABS-CBN News and Current Affairs and a spin-off to Iba-Balita. The newscast was anchored by Lynda Jumilla and Tony Velasquez.

Due to poor ratings and lack of delayed news, the final broadcast aired on August 3, 2012.

Anchors
Tony Velasquez 
Lynda Jumilla

See also
List of programs aired by Studio 23
ABS-CBN News and Current Affairs

Studio 23 news shows
Philippine television news shows
2011 Philippine television series debuts
2012 Philippine television series endings